The Handle is the name of an electric guitar created by designer Peter Solomon and produced by the company XOX Audio Tools.

The Handle is characterized by its hollow shell which construction favors direct transmission of acoustic vibrations and creates a resonance chamber similar to that of a semi-acoustic guitar.

The Handle is made from carbon fiber.

A baritone version has also been produced, called the "Billytone" after Billy Sheehan.

Related Discussions
Electric Guitar
Industrial design

References

Product design
Electric guitars